Ramón del Castillo Palop (born 3 May 1985) is a Spanish singer best known for representing Spain at the 2004 Eurovision Song Contest in Istanbul.

Biography
Ramón was born on 3 May 1985 in Las Palmas in the Canary Islands, the youngest of three boys. He participated in the third season of Operación Triunfo (2003–2004), where he finished as the runner-up and, in a separate vote, was selected to represent Spain at the Eurovision in 2004 after Beth's eighth-place finish the year before. It was his first major musical appearance – he had not been a recording artist before Operación Triunfo.

With the song "Para llenarme de ti" ("To Be Filled By You"), Ramón finished in 10th place with 87 points in the final, which was Spain's last top ten result until 2012, when Pastora Soler managed to finish in 10th place again, with the song "Quédate conmigo".

"Para llenarme de ti", which was written by Kike Santander, was also a commercial success in Spain, peaking at number one on the Spanish Singles Chart. Ramón's first album Es así, produced by Toni and Xasqui Ten, debuted at number six on the Spanish Albums Chart.

In October 2006, Ramón's second album entitled Cambio de sentido was released. The album failed to chart. In 2008, Ramón served as a judge in the regional talent show ¡Quiero ser como Pepe!, aired on TV Canaria.

In 2010, Ramón abandoned his music career. Shortly after, he finished Audiovisual Production studies at IES Politécnico Las Palmas. In 2013, he moved to Oslo, Norway to work as a camera assistant for local production company Seefood TV.

Discography

Albums 

Es así (Vale Music Records) – 2004 – No. 6 ESP
Cambio de sentido (Multitrack Records) – 2006

References

External links 

1985 births
Living people
Singers from the Canary Islands
Eurovision Song Contest entrants of 2004
People from Las Palmas
Eurovision Song Contest entrants for Spain
Operación Triunfo contestants
21st-century Spanish singers
21st-century Spanish male singers